Shane Lyons (born February 18, 1988) is an American chef, restaurateur and actor. He and partner Nick Lovvachini opened their New York restaurant in June 2013. Lyons was also a contestant on the 4th season of the Food Network's The Next Food Network Star.

Filmography

References

External links

1988 births
Living people
20th-century American male actors
21st-century American male actors
American chefs
American male child actors
American male television actors
Participants in American reality television series
Male actors from Colorado Springs, Colorado
Culinary Institute of America Hyde Park alumni